En Pottukku Sonthakkaran is a 1991 Indian Tamil-language romance film directed by Sekar Raja and produced by Kavithalayaa Productions. The film stars Ramki, Sasikala, Anju and Srividya. It was released on 5 November 1991.

Plot

Cast 
 Ramki
 Sasikala
 Anju
 Srividya
 Anand
 Ravichandran
 Manorama

Soundtrack 
The soundtrack was composed by Deva.

Release and reception 
En Pottukku Sonthakkaran was released on 5 November 1991, Diwali day, and was distributed by Pratik Pictures. N. Krishnaswamy of The Indian Express positively reviewed the film for its beginning and some of the cast performances.

References 

1990s romance films
1990s Tamil-language films
Films scored by Deva (composer)
Indian romance films